William Henry Neece (February 26, 1831 – January 3, 1909) was a U.S. Representative from Illinois.

Born near Springfield, Sangamon County (later part of Logan County), Illinois, Neece moved with his parents to McDonough County.
He attended the common schools.
He taught school.
He studied law.
He was admitted to the bar in 1858 and commenced practice in Macomb, Illinois.
He served as member of the city council in 1861.
He served as member of the State house of representatives in 1864 and 1870.
He served as member of the State constitutional convention of 1869 and 1870.
He served in the State senate 1878-1882.

Neece was elected as a Democrat to the Forty-eighth and Forty-ninth Congresses (March 4, 1883 – March 3, 1887).
He was an unsuccessful candidate for reelection in 1886 to the Fiftieth Congress.
He resumed the practice of his profession and also interested in stock raising.
He died in Chicago, Illinois, January 3, 1909.
He was interred in Oakwood Cemetery, Macomb, Illinois.

References

1831 births
1909 deaths
Democratic Party members of the Illinois House of Representatives
Democratic Party Illinois state senators
Democratic Party members of the United States House of Representatives from Illinois
19th-century American politicians